Oleksandr Petriv (born 5 August 1974) is a Ukrainian Olympic shooter. He won a gold medal in the Men's 25 metre rapid fire pistol event at the 2008 Summer Olympics in Beijing.

References

External links

Interview in Russian

1974 births
Living people
Sportspeople from Lviv
Ukrainian male sport shooters
ISSF pistol shooters
Shooters at the 2008 Summer Olympics
Olympic shooters of Ukraine
Olympic gold medalists for Ukraine
Olympic medalists in shooting
Medalists at the 2008 Summer Olympics
European Games competitors for Ukraine
Shooters at the 2019 European Games
Lviv State University of Physical Culture alumni